Hit FM is a pop music radio station in Taiwan. It broadcasts in Taipei, Taichung, and Kaohsiung.  Hit FM is owned by Voice of Taipei Broadcasting (台北之音廣播, Pinyin: Táiběi Zhī Yīn Guǎngbō). It is one of the radio stations under Hitoradio.com. Hit FM is the highest-rated Top Ten radio station in Taiwan.

Features

Fresh Release
The show, "Fresh Release" broadcast pop music. Hit Fm is one of the Chinese radio stations that broadcasts songs.  Their competitor, Kaohsiung-based KISS Radio Taiwan, also broadcasts Mandopop as well as English top 40 songs.

Hit DJ
Each Weekend, two artists (group) introduce music on air. Many Taiwanese/Mandarin Pop Music Artists, such as Jay Chou, Show Lo, A-Mei, Jolin Tsai, S.H.E, Leehom Wang, Stefanie Sun, F.I.R., etc., have done their time as DJs.

Hit FM No.1
Every day, Hit FM introduces the No. 1 song from different music charts throughout the world.
 Monday: U.S. Billboard Hot 100
 Tuesday: Hito Chinese Pop Charts (Hito 中文排行榜 Pinyin: zhōng wén pái háng bǎng)
 Wednesday: UK Singles Chart
 Thursday: Japan Oricon Charts (オリコン)
 Friday: Global Chinese Board (全球華語排行榜 Pinyin: quán qiú huá yǔ pái háng bǎng)

Hit of the Century
Every day, Hit FM retrospects significant pop music from different era after 1980s. This show broadcasts at 7:15, 11:15, 15:15, 19:15, 00:15. But now this feature has been abolished.

Annual Charts 
Hit Fm Annual Top 100 Singles Chart (Hit-Fm年度百首單曲) is a yearly compilation chart since 1998, by Hit Fm of the top 100 singles by online poll, weekly charts, and sales volume (G-Music Charts).

List of Hit Fm stations

Mandarin-language radio stations
Radio stations in Taiwan